Benjamin Brand (born 10 July 1989) is a German football referee who is based in Bamberg. He referees for FC Schallfeld 1946 of the Bavarian Football Association.

Refereeing career
Brand, referee of the club FC Schallfeld 1946, has officiated on the DFB level since 2010. In 2012, he was promoted to a 2. Bundesliga referee. In the summer of 2015, he was once again promoted, this time to the top level of German football, the Bundesliga, for the 2015–16 season. He takes the spots of retiring referees Peter Gagelmann and Thorsten Kinhöfer. He made his debut on 22 August 2015 in a match between Schalke 04 and Darmstadt 98.

Personal life
Brand lives in Bamberg, where he studies business administration.

See also
List of football referees

References

External links
 Benjamin Brand at DFB 
 
 
 

1989 births
Living people
German football referees